The Conservative People's Party (SKL) was a political party in Poland, between 1997–2003 and 2007–2014. In 2014 party was incorporated into Poland Together.

Leaders
 Artur Balazs - party chairman
 Ireneusz Niewiarowski - parliamentary caucus chairman

Members of Polish Parliament (Sejm)
SKL politicians entered parliament as members of PO Electoral Committee (Civic Platform (PO) + SKL + Real Politics Union). Several SKL members including its leaders Jan Rokita and Bronislaw Komorowski decided to join the newly created PO political party, those who refused to join PO, formed a separate SKL political caucus:
(MP, constituency)
 Dorota Arciszewska-Mielewczyk, Gdynia
 Artur Balazs, Szczecin 
 Zbigniew Chrzanowski, Siedlce 
 Ireneusz Niewiarowski, Konin
 Krzysztof Oksiuta, Warsaw 
 Małgorzata Rohde, Koszalin 
 Andrzej Wojtyła, Kalisz 
 Marek Zagórski, Białystok

Election results

Sejm

Senat

References 

1997 establishments in Poland
2014 disestablishments in Poland
Agrarian parties in Poland
Catholic political parties
Centre-right parties in Europe
Christian democratic parties in Europe
Conservative parties in Poland
Defunct political parties in Poland
Political parties disestablished in 2014
Political parties established in 1997